Earth Sound Research Corporation is a defunct American manufacturer of electric amplifiers, effects units and related equipment.

History
Initially branded ISC Audio (an abbreviation of Instrument Systems Audio Corporation), the company was a division of the Benjamin Electronics Sound Company, a marketer and distributor of high fidelity audio equipment, headquartered in Farmingdale, New York.  The president and owner of Benjamin Electronics was Joseph N. Benjamin. 

Commonly thought to have been founded in the early 1970s, Earth Sound Research Corporation was formally incorporated in New York on October 17, 1975. The Earth Sound Research offices were located in Brentwood, New York. On May 7, 1976, the Earth Sound Research company formally changed its name, re-incorporating in New York as Aucorp Sound, Inc.

The company was managed in 1978 by president Mark Neuman and vice-president and manager of sales Michael McGuire. Neuman had been associated with the late 1960s era Plush amplifier company prior to his tenure at Earth Sound Research.

Product line
Earth Sound Research specialized in electric bass and guitar amplifiers in the 1970s. They also manufactured  PA mixers, power amps, keyboards and stand alone solid state reverb units. The company also manufactured ESR brand distortion pedals such as the Graphic Fuzz which was based somewhat on a Craig Anderton fuzz and volume pedal.

Collectability
Many of the Earth Sound Research amplifiers are considered rarities throughout the vintage amplification world and are collected by many vintage amplifier enthusiasts.

Design infringement
Most of their models were either outright or close copies of then current, successful amplifiers and other audio equipment. 

Early Earth Sound Research amplifiers used all tube circuitry and were assembled inside the Benjamin Electric Sound plant in Farmingdale.  The company also hired subcontractors for component assembly.

Qualtrol Electronics, Inc., a third party subcontractor located in Deer Park, New York, supplied Earth Sound Research with amplifier chassis and sub-assemblies. Andy Fuchs, a former employee of Qualtrol said “I worked for Qualtrol, the subcontractor who made the Peavey Electronics clones... Qualtrol did a nice job (in my opinion) of copying the Peavey gear (for Earth Sound Research)... They (Qualtrol) cloned the circuits, which (ironically) were RCA textbook Transistor Manual circuits.”

Reason for failure
According to Gabe Dellevigne, who has researched the Earth Sound Research brand, "Peavey was very aware that Earth had been stealing their designs and repackaging them as their own products...  the demise of ESR was not caused by any form of litigation or infringement proceedings, rather, they simply folded for financial reasons as so many other short-lived instrument amplification companies have over the years.”

References

External links 

 - Earth Sound Research History by Pedal Haven
 - Earth Sound Research Community Forum

Guitar amplifier manufacturers
Guitar effects manufacturing companies
Audio equipment manufacturers of the United States